David Ian Calder (born 1 August 1946) is an English actor.

Life and career
Calder was born in Portsmouth, Hampshire, England, and trained at the Bristol Old Vic Theatre School. His most high-profile TV roles include Det. Insp. George Resnick in the crime series Widows and Nathan Spring in the sci-fi drama Star Cops. In 1989, he appeared in the TV adaptation of the David Lodge novel Nice Work. In 2012 he portrayed Captain Edward Smith in the ITV mini-series Titanic. From 2005–06, he took on the role of PC George Dixon in the radio adaptation of the BBC's long running television series Dixon of Dock Green.

Other TV credits include: Crown Court (TV Series),  Boys from the Blackstuff,  The Professionals, Enemy at the Door, Minder, Bergerac, The New Statesman, Between the Lines, Bramwell, Cracker, Dalziel and Pascoe, Heartbeat, Sleepers, Spooks, Midsomer Murders, Hustle, Waking the Dead, Wallis & Edward, A Touch of Frost, Cold Blood, Burn Up, Lewis and Houdini. He also appeared as Harold Hardman, the Manchester United chairman at the time of the Munich air disaster in 1958, in the TV drama United, aired by the BBC in April 2011. In 2013, he played Mr Reid in The Wrong Mans.

Calder appeared as Sir Robert King in the 1999 James Bond film The World Is Not Enough. His other film appearances include Moonlighting (1982), Defence of the Realm (1986), American Friends (1991), Hollow Reed (1996), FairyTale: A True Story (1997), The King Is Alive (2000), Perfume: The Story of a Murderer (2006), The Mummy: Tomb of the Dragon Emperor (2008) and Rush (2013).

In 1979, Calder appeared in a public information film as a crime prevention officer, asking people to consider how they would get into their own home if they lost their keys. The PIF, which was used to encourage people to make their homes secure, and to contact their crime prevention officer for advice, ran until at least 1985. In February 2010, Calder played Stuart Bell in the television film On Expenses.

In October 2016, Calder played Gus, in The Intelligent Homosexual's Guide to Capitalism and Socialism with a Key to the Scriptures by Tony Kushner at the Hampstead Theatre.

In October 2016, he appeared as Mr Bruff in the BBC mini-series The Moonstone and from October 2017 in the title role of Julius Caesar at the new Bridge Theatre. This production was broadcast by National Theatre Live in March 2018.

Also in 2018, Calder played a closeted gay man suffering from dementia on BBC's Call the Midwife.

Filmography

References

External links

1946 births
Alumni of Bristol Old Vic Theatre School
English male film actors
English male television actors
Living people
Male actors from Portsmouth
20th-century English male actors
21st-century English male actors